Stringtown is a ghost town in Bell County, in the U.S. state of Texas. It is located within the Killeen-Temple-Fort Hood metropolitan area.

History
A post office named String was established in 1901 and remained in operation until 1904. There were two businesses in 1931 with a church and several scattered houses in 1948. Its name was changed to Stringtown in 1964 and had Dyess Grove Church. The community had disappeared by 1988.

Geography

Education
Dyess Grove School served 76 students in 1903 and remained in 1948. Today, Stringtown is located within the Rogers Independent School District.

References

Ghost towns in Texas